Kim Min-Jee (Hangul: 김민지) (born January 7, 1986) is a South Korean short track speed skater.

External links
 Kim Min-Jee's profile, from https://web.archive.org/web/20090314022503/http://worldshorttrack.com/; retrieved 2010-03-12.

1986 births
Living people
South Korean female short track speed skaters
Asian Games medalists in short track speed skating
Short track speed skaters at the 2003 Asian Winter Games
Asian Games gold medalists for South Korea
Asian Games bronze medalists for South Korea
Medalists at the 2003 Asian Winter Games
21st-century South Korean women